The following list of cowboys and cowgirls from the frontier era of the American Old West (circa 1830 to 1910) was compiled to show examples of the cowboy and cowgirl genre.

Cattlemen, ranchers, and cowboys
 Harve Wilson (1867–1951)
 Preston Nutter (1848-1936)
 Calico Jones (1832–????)
*John Chisum (1824–1884)
 Charles Francis Colcord (1859–1934)
*Jesse Lincoln "J.T." Driskill (1824–1890)
 Andrew Drumm (1828–1919)
 Frank "Pistol Pete" Eaton (1860–1958)
 John King Fisher (1854–1884)
 Charles Goodnight (1836–1929)
*Richard King (1824–1885)
 Pete Kitchen (1822–1895)
 Raymond Knight (rodeo organizer) (1872–1947)
 George W. Littlefield (1842–1920)
 Oliver Loving (1812–1867)
*George W. McJunkin (1851–1922)
 Robert Benjamin "Ben" Masterson (1853–1931)
 Frank H. Maynard (1853–1926)
*Zachary Taylor "Zack" Miller (1878–1952)
 Burton C. Mossman (1867–1956)
 Thomas O'Connor (1819–1887)
 William "Bill" Pickett (1870–1932)
 Abel Head "Shanghai" Pierce (1834–1900)
 Will Rogers (1879–1935)
 Theodore Roosevelt (1858–1919)
 Charles Angelo "Charlie" Siringo (1855–1928)
 John Ware (~1845–1905)
*Nate Champion (1857–1892)

Wild West show and rodeo performers
 Earl W. Bascom (1906–1995)
 Yakima Canutt (1896–1986)
 William Frederick "Buffalo Bill" Cody (1846–1917)
 James Butler "Wild Bill" Hickok (1837–1876)
 Raymond Knight (1872–1947)
 Texas Jack Omohundro (1846–1880)
 Texas Jack, Jr. (1860–1905)
 Jack Hoxie (1885–1965)
 Gordon William "Pawnee Bill" Lillie (1860–1942)
 May Lillie, née Manning (1869–1936)
 Thomas E. "Tom" Mix (1880–1940)
 Lucille Mulhall (1885–1940)
 Annie Oakley (1860–1926)
 Will Rogers (1879–1935)
 Gabriel Dumont (1837–1906)

Fictional
*Hopalong Cassidy
 Rawhide Kid
 Cisco Kid
 Lucky Luke
 Red Ryder
 Shane
 Tonto
 Zorro
 Barbarosa
*Pecos Bill and Slue-Foot Sue
*Cole Cassidy
 Hol Horse
 Arthur Morgan
 John Marston
 Sheriff Woody (''Toy Story)
 Sheriff Callie

See also
 List of American Old West outlaws
 List of Western lawmen
 National Cowgirl Hall of Fame Honorees

References

 
Cowboys
Lists of American people by occupation
American Old West-related lists
People of the American Old West